Slash (Slashdot-Like Automated Storytelling Homepage) is a content management system, originally created for Slashdot, one of the oldest collaborative sites on the Internet.  Slash has also been known as Slashcode.

Slash is a set of modules, plugins and applets — scripts or programs executed by the server — written in Perl.

History 
Early versions of Slash were written by Rob Malda, founder of Slashdot, in the spring of 1998. Andover.net bought Slashdot in June 1999.  

Rehash remains primarily under the GNU General Public License and anyone can contribute to development.

SoylentNews 
SoylentNews is a fork of Slashdot using a 2009 fork of the Slashdot engine. Michael Casadevall (NCommander), is a New York Ubuntu core developer, and SoylentNews Public Benefit Corporation (SN PBC) president.

References

External links 
  — archive of former official site, inactive after 2009
  — historical copy of Slash source code
  — historical SoylentNews copy of Slash source code imported from SourceForge in 2009
  — SoylentNews Rehash code since 2009

1998 software
Blog software
Content management systems
Free content management systems
Free software programmed in Perl
Website management
Slashdot